Ojima (written: 小島 or 小嶋 lit. "small island") is a Japanese surname. Notable people with the surname include:

, Japanese entrepreneur who was a founder and chairman of Huser Co., Ltd
, former Japanese football player

Japanese-language surnames